The Carl B. Stokes Federal Court House Building is a skyscraper located in downtown Cleveland, Ohio. It is also known as the Carl B. Stokes Federal Court House Tower, Federal Court House Tower, and the Stokes Tower. It is currently the fourth tallest United States courthouse in the country.

The tower is named after Carl Stokes, the 51st Mayor of Cleveland and the first African American mayor of a major city. Construction began in 1999 and was completed in 2002.

Tenants include the Cleveland-based federal circuit, district, and magistrate judges, the Clerk of Court for the Northern District of Ohio, the U.S. Probation and Pretrial Services Office, the offices of the United States Attorney for the Northern District of Ohio, the U.S. Marshal's Office, and the U.S. Department of Justice Antitrust Division's Cleveland Field Office, as well as the U.S. Immigration Court.

The headless and armless statue is one of the sculptor's variations on the Venus de Milo.

See also
List of tallest buildings in Cleveland

References

External links

ClevelandSkyscrapers.com

Skyscraper office buildings in Cleveland
Federal courthouses in the United States
Courthouses in Ohio
Government buildings completed in 2002
2002 establishments in Ohio